Benjamin Franklin High School (FHS) is a public high school in the Highland Park neighborhood, approximately seven miles northeast of downtown Los Angeles, California, United States. It is part of the Los Angeles Unified School District.

First established in 1916 with an enrollment of 225 students, the school currently educates approximately 1,400 students.

It was in the Los Angeles City High School District until 1961, when it merged into LAUSD.

Notable alumni

 Alan Arkin, 1951 graduate, Oscar-winning actor
 Lee Baca, 1960 graduate, sheriff of Los Angeles County, 1998-2016
 Alana Cordy-Collins, 1962 graduate, archaeologist
 Rocky Delgadillo, politician and former City Attorney of Los Angeles (2001–2009)
 Daryl F. Gates, 1944 graduate, Los Angeles police chief (1978–1992)
 Eunisses Hernandez, (1990) member-elect of the Los Angeles City Council for the 1st district (elected 2022) 
 Mike Hernandez, former member of the Los Angeles City Council for the 1st district (1991–2001)
 Allen Jacobs, 1960 graduate, National Football League player, fullback and halfback. Played for Green Bay Packers under Vince Lombardi.
 Sammy Lee, Olympic gold medalist diver
 Ron Lopez, football player, Utah State graduate.
 Dick Moje, National Football League player, defensive end
 Louis R. Nowell (1915–2000), former member of the Los Angeles City Council for the 1st district (1963–77)
 Bobby Riggs, Wimbledon champion and member of the International Tennis Hall of Fame
 Franklin E. Roach (1905-1993), 1923 graduate, astronomer, professor, ufologist, and a father of aeronomy
 Gene Roddenberry (1921-1991), 1939 graduate,  television screenwriter and creator of Star Trek: The Original Series 
 Bui Simon, former Miss Universe and Miss Thailand 1988
 Richard "Humpty" Vission, 1987 graduate, Grammy-nominated producer and KPWR Power 106 FM DJ
 Jean Spangler (1923-1949?), 1941 graduate, actress, model and possible murder victim. Disappeared in 1949.
 Jim Tunney, 1947 graduate, NFL referee for 31 years, worked 3 Super Bowls; Franklin Principal, 1972-1973

References

External links 

 Official FHS site

Educational institutions established in 1916
Los Angeles Unified School District schools
High schools in Los Angeles
Public high schools in California
Highland Park, Los Angeles
1916 establishments in California